Blue book is a type of information literature.

Blue Book may also refer to:

 Blue Book (CD standard), a standard defining the Enhanced Music CD format (E-CD, CD-Extra, CD-Plus or CD+)
 Project Blue Book, a USAF study of UFOs in the 1950s and 1960s
 The Blue Book Network, a US media company
 Regulations for the Order and Discipline of the Troops of the United States or Blue Book, a tactical manual
 Blue Book, the American name for one of the Japanese naval codes during World War II
 Blue Book (Bryce and Toynbee book) 1916 book on the Armenian genocide, officially titled The Treatment of Armenians in the Ottoman Empire
 Treason of the Blue Books, the reaction to Reports of the Commissioners of Inquiry into the state of education in Wales, a British Government's report on education, published in 1847 and commonly known as the "Blue Books"
Blue book on Smalltalk-80 programming environment implementation
 Blue and Brown Books, lecture notes by philosopher Ludwig Wittgenstein
 Bluebook, a style guide for legal citations in the United States

See also 

 Blaubuch ("Blue Book"), a list by the German Federal Government of culturally important sites in eastern Germany
 The Blue Pages (disambiguation)
 Blue paper, technical specification whitepapers
 Project Blue Book (TV series), a 2019 TV series on History Channel